Heart Attack is the third extended play by South Korean girl group AOA, released on June 22, 2015 by FNC Entertainment. The song of the same name was used as the lead single for the album.

Singles
The song "Heart Attack" was written and composed by Brave Brothers.

The first music video teaser was released on June 14, 2015 with the second teaser released on June 16, 2015. AOA are dressed as lacrosse players in their teasers.

AOA started their Korean promotions with a showcase on June 22 at AX Korea.
The promotion of "Heart Attack" began June 25 on the show M! Countdown. The song was also promoted on the shows, Music Bank, Music Core and Inkigayo.

They won their first music show for 'Heart Attack' on July 1, 2015 on Show Champion.

Japanese and Chinese version
On June 17, 2015 was revealed that AOA will release a Japanese and Chinese version of "Heart Attack". "Heart Attack" was released in Chinese on July 31, 2015 through Baidu Music, Sina Music, QQ Music and Taiwan's KKBOX.

The Japanese version was released in Japan as a single on July 29, 2015 and AOA filmed a separate music video for it. The single was released in eleven different versions: two limited CD+DVD editions, two limited CD+Photobook editions and seven limited CD only editions, one edition per member.

Track listing

Charts

Sales and certifications

References

2015 EPs
AOA (group) EPs
Korean-language EPs
Dance-pop EPs
FNC Entertainment EPs